Common names: Southern Italian asp, South-Italian asp viper, more.

Vipera aspis hugyi is a venomous viper subspecies endemic to southern Italy.

Description
Usually, it is marked with a fused zigzag stripe and has a distinctly raised snout. Specimens from Montecristo Island, sometimes referred to as V. a. montecristi, are similar, but with a reduced tendency for the dorsal markings to fuse.

Common names
The species is also known as the Southern Italian asp, the South-Italian asp viper, or Hugy's viper. Previously, several other common names were used to describe a subspecies that is now part of the synonymy of this form, the Monte Cristo viper or Monte Cristo asp viper for Vipera aspis montecristi.

Geographic range
It is found in Italy in Apulia, Basilicata, Calabria, Sicily and Montecristo Island.

References

Further reading
Schinz HR. 1833. Naturgeschichte und Abbildungen der Reptilien. Schaffhausen, Switzerland: Brodtmann. iv + 240 pp. + 102 plates. ("Vipera Hugyi", p. 179.)

aspis hugyi
Reptiles described in 1833